Filago is a comune (municipality) in the Province of Bergamo in the Italian region of Lombardy, located about  northeast of Milan and about  southwest of Bergamo.  

Filago borders the following municipalities: Bonate Sotto, Bottanuco, Brembate, Capriate San Gervasio, Dalmine, Madone, Osio Sopra, Osio Sotto.

People 

 Maurizio Malvestiti, (1953), bishop of Lodi.

References

External links
Official website